Dr. Jayadevi Jangamashetti  is an Indian singer. She is a Hindustani classical music vocalist of Jaipur Gwaliar gharana. Dr. Jayadevi is the first female film music director of Kannada cinema - Raag Bhairavi, which is based on Hindustani classical music. The film was released in 2019.

Early life and training
Born in Raichur into a family with strong interest in musical art, Jayadevi started her early classical training under the guidance of Pt. Panchakshari swami mattigatti (Disciple of Dr Mallikarjun Mansur) for more than six years. Vidushi Smt. Jayashree Patnekar and Pt. Rajashekhar Mansoor, son of Great legend Dr Mallikarjuna Mansoor, also taught her.

Education
Dr. Jayadevi holds a Master's degree in Music and earned a doctorate for the research of 'Vachana singing heritage' from the Karnataka University Dharwad.She has completed Vidwat, Visharada.

Performing career
Dr.Jayadevi has published a book on Vachana sangeeta Ratna Pt. Siddharama Jambaladinni (Disciple of Points Panchakshari Gawaii ji and Dr Mallikarjun Mansur) who was a renowned vocalist, and published her PhD thesis as a Kedillavagi Haaduve. Dr Jayadevi has been on concert tours to every part of the country and frequently performs at prestigious music conferences around the state, including Maharashtra, Andra Pradesh, Kerala, Tamil Nadu, Delhi, Pandichery and Muscat, Bahrain, and Dubai.

A few of the concerts included:
DR Mallikarjun Mansur Rashtreeya Sangeetotsav Dharwad 
Vishwa Kannada sammealana, Belagavi
Rajguru National Music Festival, Dharwad
Horanadu Kannadigara, Sangeethothsava, Pondicherry
V.K. Gokak's centenary celebration, Kendra saahitya Academy, New Delhi
Dr Jayadevi has been nominated as Syndicate member of Karnataka Rajya Dr. Gangubai Hangal Music and Performing arts University Mysore (Governor's Nominee. Dated : 16-09-2017 for 3 years Duration). She works as an assistant professor in the Music and Fine Arts Department at Central University of Karnataka.

Discography 
CD's Released 
Sri Siddalingeshwara vaani Yadiyur Vachana Gayana
Bhakti Beladingalu ~Vachana Gayana by Akash Audio
Raaga ranga~ classical music by Lahari Audio company
 SurSunaad~ Classical Vocal By Lahari Audio company
Sunari Sakhi ~  Classical Vocal By Lahari Audio company
Raaga Tarangini ~ Classical Vocal By Lahari Audio company
Godhooli ~Classical singing
Guruve Namo ~Vachana Gayana by Lahari Audio company
Harinama Smarane~Dasa Avni by Lahari audio company 
Suno Bhayi Sadho ~ Bhajans by Lahari audio company 
Devotional songs on Gurudatta by Nisarga Audio
MSIL, Dharwad composed by Sri. Nimbargi
MSIL, Mysore composed by Sri. Upadhyaya
Jeevana gnanadinda muktiyo~ Madara Channayya Vachans by Lahari audio company, Bangalore
Akkamahadevi Suprabhata~Akkana Balaga Udutadi
Raaga bhairavi cinema audio..Lahari Recording company, Bangalore

Book's Published 
Vachana Sangeeta Ratna:Pt.Siddrama Jambaldini-a research work on music 2012
Kedillavagi Haaduve-a research work on Vachanna Gaayana tradition 2015
Bayala Naadava Hadidu:a research work on Hindustani classical music tradition-2017
Geeta Matemba jyothi:a research work 2018
Ulava Naadada Charana:a research work on musicology 2021

Awards 
Mallikarjun Mansur Rashtriya Samman - Youth Award
Ramanashri Award for Vachana Gayana
Cultural Guru Award by Govt.of Karnataka Bala Vikasa Academy
State level Amma Award
 Bharat Ratna Bismilla Khan Yuva Puraskara Chennai
 Karnataka sangeeta Nrutya(govt.of Karnataka) academy's book award.. for the ULIVA NAADADA CHARANA -A research book on musicology...Rs.25000/-Cash and memento...
 Dr.Nanda patil endowment award for Vachana gaayana...by Karnataka vidyavardhaka Sangha Dharawad

References

External links
 Musical tribute to Shanthadevi Kanavi on 80th birthday
Hindustani singers
Singers from Karnataka
Indian women classical singers
People from Raichur
People from Dharwad
20th-century Indian singers
Women Hindustani musicians
20th-century Indian women singers
Women musicians from Karnataka